Mesopsocus graecus is a species of Psocoptera from the Mesopsocidae family that can be found in Cyprus, Greece, and North Aegean islands.

References

Mesopsocidae
Insects described in 1981
Psocoptera of Europe